Yuliya Vasilyevna Safina (born 1 July 1950) is a retired Russian handball player. She won gold medals with the Soviet teams at the 1980 Olympics and 1982 World Championships.

References

1950 births
Living people
Soviet female handball players
Russian female handball players
Handball players at the 1980 Summer Olympics
Olympic handball players of the Soviet Union
Olympic gold medalists for the Soviet Union
Olympic medalists in handball
Medalists at the 1980 Summer Olympics
Sportspeople from Altai Krai